The Seattle Totems were a professional ice hockey franchise in Seattle, Washington. Under several names prior to 1958, the franchise was a member of the Pacific Coast Hockey League (renamed the Western Hockey League in 1952) between 1944 and 1974. In their last season of existence, the Totems played in the Central Hockey League in the 1974–75 season. They played their home games in the Civic Ice Arena and later at the Seattle Center Coliseum. The Totems won three WHL Lester Patrick Cup championships in 1959, 1967 and 1968.

The Totems were one of the few American-based professional clubs to play a touring Soviet team. On December 25, 1972, the Totems lost to the Soviets 9–4. A rematch between the two teams was held on January 4, 1974, where, led by Don Westbrooke's three goals, the Totems won 8–4.

Franchise history

Seattle Ironmen (1944–52)

After World War II, the Pacific Coast Hockey League (PCHL), a major professional league on the West Coast in the 1910s and 1920s, was resurrected as a semi-professional loop. Seattle, as a notably strong hockey town and the first city outside of Canada to host a Stanley Cup champion (the 1917 Seattle Metropolitans), was granted two franchises, one of which were the Seattle Ironmen.

The club had been founded as an amateur team the previous year in the Northwest Industrial Hockey League, where they were known as the Seattle Isaacson Iron Workers. As NIHL teams were operated by war industry companies, most players for the Iron Workers additionally worked at the production lines of the U.S. Navy's Isaacson Steel plant in nearby Tukwila, Washington. 

When the club entered the new PCHL in its inaugural 1944–45 season, it was renamed the Seattle Ironmen and hired Frank Dotten as its new head coach. The club had modest success, finishing in first place in the 1947–48 regular season. When the league itself became fully professional for the 1948–49 season, only four of the previous season's players remained, leaving the roster to be replaced by amateur players from Tacoma and the team to finish last in its division. 

Over its existence, the Ironmen's most notable stars were Gordon Kerr, the team's leading scorer in those years with 235 points in 244 games, William Robinson, Eddie Dartnell and Joe Bell. Among other notables for the team were future NHL star goaltender Al Rollins and legendary Philadelphia Flyers coach Fred Shero.

The Ironmen served as inspiration for the 2022 Reverse Retro alternate uniform for the NHL's Seattle Kraken.

Seattle Bombers (1952–54)
In 1952, the league changed its name to the Western Hockey League (WHL), and the Ironmen themselves changed their name to the Seattle Bombers the following season.  The team continued to play poorly for two seasons, and the only bright spot was the debut for Seattle of the greatest minor league scorer of all time, Guyle Fielder.  After two seasons of increasing travel costs—for which the Bombers received aid from the league—Seattle suspended operations for the 1955 season.

Seattle Americans (1955–58)

The team rejoined the WHL as the Seattle Americans the following season, finishing in first place in 1957 led by a tremendous season by Fielder, who broke the professional single season scoring record with 122 points en route to Most Valuable Player honors and the first of four straight scoring championships for Seattle.  Among other notables for the Americans were Val Fonteyne, notable as the least penalized player of all time, future Vezina winner Charlie Hodge, and future National Hockey League general managers Emile Francis and Keith Allen.  The team's final season as the Americans, in 1958, saw the first time the franchise would win a playoff series.

Seattle Totems (1958–75)
The Americans were renamed the Seattle Totems for the 1958–59 season, the name by which it would go for the rest of its existence.  Fielder and Filion remained the team's great stars, but like many other WHL teams the Totems had very stable rosters, and players such as Marc Boileau, Gerry Leonard, Bill MacFarland, Jim Powers, Gordie Sinclair and future NHL coach and general manager Tom McVie spent many seasons each in Seattle colors.  Allen was the team's coach its first seven seasons as the Totems, guiding the team to a first-place finish in 1959 and to the playoffs six out of the seven years of his tenure. The Totems played the 1974–75 season in the Central Hockey League after the WHL folded.

Terminated NHL expansion franchise
On June 12, 1974, the NHL announced that a Seattle group headed by Vince Abbey had been awarded an expansion team to begin play in the 1976–77 season. A $180,000 deposit was due by the end of 1975 and the total franchise fee was $6 million. Additionally, Abbey had to repurchase the shares in the Totems held by the Vancouver Canucks, who were using the minor-league Totems as a farm club. The expansion announcement also included a franchise for Denver, and with the loss of two more of its major markets, the WHL announced on the same day that it was folding. The Totems joined the Central Hockey League for 1974–75.

After missing a number of deadlines while scrambling to secure financing, the NHL threatened to pull the franchise as there were a number of other suitors in the wings. Abbey allegedly passed on an opportunity to purchase a WHA team for $2 million during this period, and he missed an opportunity to acquire an existing franchise when the Pittsburgh Penguins were sold in a bankruptcy auction for $4.4 million in June 1975.

The Totems folded following the 1974–75 CHL season after acquiring $2 million in debt, leaving the city without hockey for the first time in two decades; the Seattle Breakers (now the Thunderbirds) would begin play in 1977 in the junior Western Canada Hockey League. After a failed attempt by Abbey to purchase the California Seals in June, the NHL pulled the expansion franchise from Seattle. Abbey filed suit against the NHL and the Canucks for anti-trust violations that he alleged prevented him from acquiring a team; it was finally settled in favor of the NHL in 1986. In 2018, the NHL again awarded Seattle an NHL team, the Seattle Kraken, which began play in 2021.

Season-by-season results (1943–75)
 1943–44 – Northwest International Hockey League 
 1944–52 – Pacific Coast Hockey League  
 1952–74 – Western Hockey League           
 1974–75 – Central Hockey League
Note: GP = Games played, W = Wins, L = Losses, T = Ties, Pts = Points, GF = Goals for, GA = Goals against, PIM = Penalties in minutes

See also
 Seattle Kraken
 Seattle Totems (junior hockey) – current team in the Western States Hockey League
 Ice hockey in Seattle
 Pioneer Square totem pole

References

External links
 List of NHL alumni
 All-time roster (WHL, 1958–1974)
 All-time roster (CHL, 1974–1975)
 Seattle Totems page at Seattlehockey.net
 Website dedicated to the Seattle Totems (1958–75)

Defunct ice hockey teams in the United States
Central Professional Hockey League teams
Ice hockey in Seattle
Ice hockey teams in Washington (state)
Philadelphia Flyers minor league affiliates
Vancouver Canucks minor league affiliates
Western Hockey League (1952–1974) teams
1944 establishments in Washington (state)
1975 disestablishments in Washington (state)